Sébastien Kamba (born 25 December 1941), is a Congolese filmmaker. One of the pioneer filmmakers in Congolese film industry, he has directed short films with the collaboration with French filmmakers.

Personal life
He was born on 25 December 1941 in Brazzaville, Republic of Congo.

Career
He moved to France, and studied at the Office for Radiophonic Cooperation. Later he received a television internship in Paris and also as a teacher. In 1964, Kamba made the first Congolese fiction film, a political short film Le Peuple du Congo-Léo vaincra. It was produced with the collaboration with a television media.

In 1966, he made the short Kaka yo and then the short Mwana keba in 1970. In 1973, Kamba directed the first feature film in the Republic of Congo: La Rançon d'une alliance, adapted from the novel 'La légende de Mfoumou Ma Mazono' by Jean Malonga. In 1992, he published the book Cinématographique et Parti Unique (Cinematographic Production and Unique Party. The example of Congo).

On 1 February 2019, the 1st edition of the Congolese cinema excellence trophies was titled "Les Kamba's Awards" in honor of Kamba was held in Brazzaville.

Filmography

References

External links
 

Living people
Republic of the Congo film directors
1941 births